The Cape Henlopen Region, or the Cape Region, is a region in Sussex County, in southern Delaware, on the Delmarva Peninsula. The region is part of the Salisbury, Maryland-Delaware Metropolitan Statistical Area. The region takes its name from Cape Henlopen, as does the Cape Henlopen School District and Cape Henlopen State Park. Much of the region's populated areas are found along the Delaware Bay, Rehoboth Bay and the Atlantic Ocean. Northern and western parts of the Cape Region are rural areas dominated by farmland and wetlands. The area is often referred to as the Delaware Beaches.

Geography

The Cape Region is situated on the Atlantic Coastal Plain. A large portion of the region is low-lying Southern swamps and wetlands, notably found in Prime Hook National Wildlife Refuge, Cape Henlopen State Park, and along Delaware Route 1 within Delaware Seashore State Park. 
There are several navigable waterways that flow through the region:
Bald Eagle Creek
Broadkill River
Herring Creek
Lewes and Rehoboth Canal
Love Creek
Old Mill Creek
Red Mill Pond
Wagamons Pond
White Oak Creek

Climate
Situated on the Atlantic Coastal Plain, Rehoboth Beach's weather is moderated by the Atlantic Ocean, Delaware Bay and the Rehoboth Bay.  Rehoboth Beach has a mild subtropical climate consisting of hot, humid summers and mild winters.  The average daytime high in July is 87 °F (30.6 °C) and a low of 70 °F (21 °C); in January, the average high is 45 °F (7 °C) with an average low of 30 °F (-1 °C)   The month of highest average rainfall is July with 4.78 inches of rain, while February is historically the driest month, receiving an average of only 3.23 inches (80.5 mm) of rain.

The highest official temperature ever recorded in Rehoboth Beach was 102 °F (38.8 °C) in 1997.  The lowest official temperature ever recorded in Rehoboth Beach was -11 °F (-28.8 °C) in 1982.

Communities

Cities

Lewes (Principal city)
Rehoboth Beach

Towns
Dewey Beach
Henlopen Acres
Milton

Unincorporated places
Angola
Belltown
Broadkill Beach
Cool Spring
Five Points
Hollymount
Hollyville
Jimtown
Midway
Nassau
Pinetown
Quakertown

Demographics
Because the Cape Region is not yet a politically defined area, collecting demographic data is tricky.  At the 2010 Census, the approximate total population of the Cape Region was 41,584 which is an increase of 10,998 (35%) from 30,856 (2000 Census).
The Cape Region tends to be more affluent than western parts of Sussex County.

See also
Cape Henlopen
Cape Henlopen State Park
Cape Henlopen School District
Delaware Seashore State Park
Delaware Beaches
Cape May–Lewes Ferry

References

External links
Cape Gazette
Cape Henlopen Regional Plan
Cape Henlopen School District
Cape Henlopen School District Map
Sussex County Government
District 6 Map

Geography of Sussex County, Delaware